The 2017 Millersville Marauders football team represents Millersville University of Pennsylvania in Division II football.

Background

Previous season
In 2016 the Marauders had a dismal 2–9 record and 1–6 in PSAC play. The 2016 season was the fourth year under head coach Greg Breitbach.

Departures
The following players graduated following the 2016 season:

Schedule

Regular season

Roster

References

Millersville
Millersville Marauders football seasons
Millersville Marauders football